The Turkish-Palestinian Friendship Hospital was built and equipped by the Turkish Cooperation and Coordination Agency (TİKA). The construction of the hospital started in 2010 during the premiership of  Recep Tayyip Erdoğan when the Board of Trustees of the Islamic University of Gaza requested that a training and research hospital be built for the university in the Gaza Strip. TİKA was subsequently instructed to build the Palestine-Turkey Friendship Hospital, where construction began in 2011 and was completed in 2017 at a total cost of 70 million US dollars.{
  "type": "FeatureCollection",
  "features": [
    {
      "type": "Feature",
      "properties": {},
      "geometry": {
        "type": "Point",
        "coordinates": [
          34.416112,
          31.477935
        ]
      }
    }
  ]
}

Facilities 
The hospital was built at the campus of the Faculty of Medicine at the Islamic University of Gaza, which is located south of Gaza City. It has a total interior space of 33,400 sq. meters and consists of 8 interconnected blocks, with 4 operating rooms, intensive care units, laboratories, and 200 beds. In its full capacity, the hospital can serve up to 30000 patients annually, as well as provide health training for 500 medical students, 800 nursing students, and 400 allied health services students per year.

Operation 
In the wake of the COVID-19 pandemic in 2020, the Turkish-Palestinian Friendship Hospital was transferred to Palestinian authorities to operate as a COVID-19 isolation and treatment facility. A provisional deed of transfer was issued and signed by TİKA and the Rectorate of the Islamic University of Gaza for the transfer of the hospital, upon which the hospital was transferred fully to Gaza authorities on March 26, 2020.

In November 2021, as the COVID-19 pandemic began to subside, the Gaza Ministry of Health began relocating oncology and oncology-related services from the different governmental hospitals in the Gaza Strip to the Turkish-Palestinian Friendship Hospital in a bid to "unify the diagnostic and treatment services in one specialized and integrated center". The Hospital currently operates under a joint administration from IUG and the MoH.

Gallery

References 

Hospitals in Gaza City